During the 2004–05 German football season, Alemannia Aachen competed in the 2. Bundesliga.

Season summary
Alemannia Aachen failed to gain promotion to the Bundesliga or even repeat their cup run of the previous season, but still enjoyed a decent run in the UEFA Cup, making it through the group stages before being knocked out in the round of 32 by eventual semi-finalists AZ.

First-team squad
Squad at end of season

Left club during season

Transfers

In
 Emil Noll - VfR Aalen
 Mirko Casper - Yurdumspor Köln
 Moses Sichone - Köln
 Thomas Hengen - 1. FC Kaiserslautern
 Thomas Stehle - 1. FC Nürnberg
 Jan Schlaudraff - Borussia Mönchengladbach, January
 Sergio Pinto - FC Schalke 04
 Jens Scharping - VfB Lübeck
 Cristian Fiél - VfL Bochum
 Kristian Nicht - 1. FC Nürnberg
 Florian Bruns - 1. FC Union Berlin
 Chris Iwelumo - unattached (last at Stoke City), 12 July 
 Simon Rolfes - Werder Bremen
 Ivan Petrović - Napredak Kruševac

Out

Results

UEFA Cup

First round

Group stage

Round of 32
 Alemannia Aachen 0-0 AZ
 AZ 2-1 Alemannia Aachen

References

Alemannia Aachen seasons
German football clubs 2004-05 season